Masbate's at-large congressional district refers to the lone congressional district of the Philippines in the province of Masbate for various national legislatures before 1987. The province had its representatives elected or appointed province-wide at-large from its reorganization under Article 6 of the Decreto de 18 junio de 1898 y las instrucciones sobre el régimen de las provincias y pueblos for the Malolos Congress in 1898 until the creation of a first, second and third district on February 2, 1987. It was represented as a single-member district when it was re-established as a regular province separate from Sorsogon in 1920 and took part in five legislatures of the Insular Government of the Philippine Islands from 1922 to 1935, the three legislatures of the Philippine Commonwealth from 1935 to 1946, and the seven congresses of the Third Philippine Republic from 1946 to 1972.

Masbate was allocated an additional seat on three separate occasions in its history. From 1898 to 1901, the province, then known as Masbate y Ticao, was represented by two members in the National Assembly (Malolos Congress) of the First Philippine Republic, with a separate representation for the then island province of Burias. It also sent two representatives to the National Assembly of the Second Philippine Republic from 1943 to 1944 and the national parliament of the Fourth Philippine Republic from 1984 to 1986.

After 1986, all representatives were elected from its congressional districts.

Representation history

See also
Legislative districts of Masbate

References

Former congressional districts of the Philippines
Politics of Masbate
1898 establishments in the Philippines
1986 disestablishments in the Philippines
At-large congressional districts of the Philippines
Congressional districts of the Bicol Region
Constituencies established in 1898
Constituencies disestablished in 1901
Constituencies established in 1920
Constituencies disestablished in 1987